The Snarl is a 1917 American silent drama film directed by Raymond B. West and starring Bessie Barriscale, Charles Gunn and Howard Hickman. The film's sets were designed by the art director Robert Brunton.

Cast
 Bessie Barriscale as Helen Dean / Marion Dean
 Charles Gunn as Monte Bruce
 Howard Hickman as Jack Mason
 Aggie Herring as Helen's Nurse
 Tom Guise as Opera Manager
 J. Barney Sherry as Doctor

References

Bibliography
 Robert B. Connelly. The Silents: Silent Feature Films, 1910-36, Volume 40, Issue 2. December Press, 1998.

External links
 

1917 films
1917 drama films
1910s English-language films
American silent feature films
Silent American drama films
American black-and-white films
Triangle Film Corporation films
Films directed by Raymond B. West
1910s American films